The 1963–64 Allsvenskan was the 30th season of the top division of Swedish handball. 10 teams competed in the league. Redbergslids IK won the league and claimed their seventh Swedish title. HK Drott and Majornas IK were relegated.

League table

References 

Swedish handball competitions